A hydraulic splitter, also known as rock splitter or darda splitter, is a type of portable hydraulic tool. It is used in demolition jobs which involve breaking large blocks of concrete or rocks. Its use in geology was first popularized by volcanologist David Richardson.

Following the darda splitters, the second type hydraulic splitter, known as piston splitter  began to be used in large rock demolition sites like tunneling sites or building foundation sites. This type of piston splitter produces much stronger splitting forces than darda splitters. The piston splitter requires a larger hole size diameters (usually 90mm, 95mm, 105mm and rarely 150mm or 200mm) than the darda splitter, which requires holes usually under 50mm. The cylinder diameters of the piston splitters are smaller than the holes by 10~15mm in diameter. Hwacheon HRD-tech introduced this piston splitter in late 1990 for industrial application and improved its minute details in Korea. Many others began to manufacture them as the demand rose.

The darda splitters have been manufactured by a German company, Darda and by many other manufacturers. Large size darda splitters mounted on excavator is manufactured by Yamamoto Rock international and Splitstone.
Splitstone manufactures both portable and larger splitters.  
 
The darda splitters consist of two wedges which are inserted in a pre-drilled hole and a hydraulic cylinder driven by a hydraulic power pack.

The piston splitter consists of one hydraulic power pack and one or more cylinders which has(have) one or multiple pistons on cylinder body and connecting hoses between the power pack and the cylinders.

Piston splitters have been used for demolition of rocks in building foundation, tunnels, shaft digging, trench work, quarrying and zoo areas. Large size piston splitters are mounted on an excavator for more efficient demolition.

The splitting performance is very efficient in comparison with the predrilled hole-making. As the spacing between hole is near to front and side, the number of holes required are quite many. With manual type splitter, the wedge type splitter requires 20~25 cm space, while piston type splitter requires 40~50 cm.
Larger size wedge splitter requires large spacing as much as 50~70 cm. Large size piston splitter requires 60~100 cm spacing . Large size wedge splitter or 
piston splitter is mounted on a vehicle like excavator.

More and more strict environmental regulation( noise or vibration, dust, flying rock) increases the demand for hydraulic rock ( or concrete) splitting across the world.

External links 
 Tehma SA Hydraulic Rock Splitter overview page
 "SMART" Hydraulic Rock Splitter (SHRIKRISHNA AGRO EQUIPEMENT PRIVATE LIMITED. overview page
 Nutech Hydraulic Rock Splitter overview page
 Darda's product overview page on the hydraulic splitter
 Overview of Yamamoto excavator mounted rock splitter
 Splitstone splitters
  Piston splitter web page.

Demolition
Hydraulic tools